Achinsk is a city in Krasnoyarsk Krai, Russia, located on the right bank of the Chulym River near its intersection with the Trans-Siberian Railway,  west of Krasnoyarsk. It has a population of 109,155 as of the 2010 Census.

History
Achinsk is one of the oldest known inhabited places in the area. Paleontological study has shown that people lived here as early as 28,000–20,000 BCE.

The modern city, however, was founded on July 25, 1641 as an ostrog on the Bely Iyus River. After the fire of 1683, it was moved to the Chulym River (a tributary of the Ob); hence, the official foundation date of the city is considered to be July 25, 1683. The name of the location derives from the Turkic tribal group Achi or Achigi. The first fort in 1683 was built with the high stockade square shaped walls. In the corners were placed watch towers. Initially the garrison had fifteen Cossacks patrolling it. In 1710, a new wooden fort on the right bank of the Achinki River was created, at its confluence with the Chulym.

In 1782, it was granted status of an uyezd town. In the late 19th century, the town became linked on the Trans-Siberian Railway.

Since 1990, Achinsk has been included in the official list of cities in Russia with historical and cultural value of nationwide significance.

In August 2019 a massive explosion in a military base occurred some 20 km south of the town, next to the village of Kamenka.

Administrative and municipal status
Within the framework of administrative divisions, Achinsk serves as the administrative center of Achinsky District, even though it is not a part of it. As an administrative division, it is, together with one urban-type settlement (Mazulsky), incorporated separately as the krai city of Achinsk—an administrative unit with the status equal to that of the districts. As a municipal division, the krai city of Achinsk is incorporated as Achinsk Urban Okrug.

Demographics
Achinsk grew rapidly in the 20th century: from a population of 32,000 in 1939, to 85,000 in 1969, to 121,572 in the 1989 Census. The population declined slightly in the early 21st century: 118,744 (2002 Census) and 109,155 (2010 Census).

Economy
The economy of Achinsk is based around heavy industry and contains a refinery and also produces construction materials, including wood, asphalt, cement. Mechanical, wax, brick and electrical plants are also present. It is also involved with the food industry and contains dairy factories and a meat processing plant as well as footwear and furniture factories.

The largest enterprise of the city, the Achinsk Alumina Plant, belongs to the "Rusal" group. In addition, the city operates a cement plant which produces about two million tons of cement per year.

Transportation
The city operates buses, trams, and taxis, and is served by the Achinsk Airport.

Culture and education
As of 2006, Achinsk has eleven health facilities and over twenty schools. Notable landmarks include the Achinsk Drama Theater, Achinsk National History Museum, Achinsk Museum and Exhibition Center, and the Kazan Cathedral (1832).

The print media are represented by the municipal authority "Achinskaya Gazeta", the regional publication "Prichulymsky Vestnik", as well as local private publications: "Novaya Prichulymka" and "Gorod" A ". The newspaper "Komsomolskaya Pravda" is published. There are three local TV channels in Achinsk: Achinsk Television (ATV), Novy Vek and OSA.

Climate
Achinsk has a humid continental climate (Köppen Dfb) bordering closely on a subarctic climate (Dfc), just like its neighbouring cities in southern Krasnoyarsk Krai. Winter is moderately cold, just like Western Siberia, however extreme temperatures below -50 °C have been recorded. Summers are warm and damp, much wetter than winters.

References

Notes

Sources

External links
Official website of Achinsk 
Directory of organizations in Achinsk 

Cities and towns in Krasnoyarsk Krai
Achinsk Urban Okrug
Yeniseysk Governorate
Populated places established in 1682